The following is a list of drawings by Rembrandt that are generally accepted as autograph.

See also
List of paintings by Rembrandt
List of etchings by Rembrandt
Rembrandt's Mughal drawings

Sources

 Rembrandt Drawings: 116 Masterpieces in Original Color. Dover Publications, Inc. Mineola, New York. 2007. .
 http://www.garyschwartzarthistorian.nl/schwartzlist/?id=148

Rembrandt Drawings